Kütt is an Estonian surname (meaning "hunter"). Notable people with this surname include:
Alfred Kütt (disambiguation), multiple people
Helmen Kütt (born 1961), Estonian politician
Kert Kütt (born 1980), Estonian footballer

Estonian-language surnames
Occupational surnames